The Johnsonburg, Kane, Warren and Irvine Railroad  was a railroad company in Pennsylvania, United States, formed on May 24, 1982, by Sloan Cornell who also owned the Knox and Kane Railroad. The JKWI was the designated operator of the Irvine, Warren, Kane & Johnsonburg Railroad, that was a partnership of Brock Railroad (a wholly owned subsidiary of Warren Car Company), Irvine Railroad (a wholly owned subsidiary of National Forge Company) and Struthers Wells Inter-American Corporation (a subsidiary of Struthers Wells), all three being Pennsylvania corporations, and had acquired from Conrail the following railroad line segments: MP 58.52 to MP 66.7 (Irvine to Warren) and MP 92.5 to MP 111.0 (Kane to Johnsonburg). 

Operation of the Irvine to Johnsonburg trackage began on July 16, 1982, while registration of the business entity IWK&J RAILROAD COMPANY with the Pennsylvania Department of State followed on October 18, 1982, 

The property was sold to Hammermill Paper, which began operations under the Allegheny Railroad name on September 3, 1985. The Johnsonburg, Kane, Warren & Irvine Railroad Company filed a Certificate of Election to Dissolve on September 10, 1985, and filed Articles of Dissolution on October 3, 1986.

Locomotive Roster

Photo gallery

References

 
 

Defunct Pennsylvania railroads
Spin-offs of Conrail